GRMN may refer to:

 Garmin (stock ticker symbol GRMN), an American technology company
 Toyota GRMN, line-up of performance vehicles developed by Toyota Gazoo Racing